Phạm Văn Tý (born 15 May 1955) is a Vietnamese wrestler. He competed in the men's freestyle 57 kg at the 1980 Summer Olympics.

References

External links
 

1955 births
Living people
Vietnamese male sport wrestlers
Olympic wrestlers of Vietnam
Wrestlers at the 1980 Summer Olympics
Place of birth missing (living people)